Lucas Sideras (5 December 1944, Athens) is the former drummer of the Greek progressive rock band Aphrodite's Child.

Biography

Aphrodite's Child
He started playing drums at the age of 13. By the time he was 15 years old, he started playing drums with several bands in Athens. Later on he met Vangelis and Demis Roussos and they formed Aphrodite's Child. In 1967 they signed with Mercury Records in France and they released three albums: End of the world (which includes the song "Rain and Tears"), It's Five O'Clock and 666, the latter of which sold 20 million copies worldwide.

Going  solo
After Aphrodite's Child split up in 1972, Lucas began to compose his own music and released his first solo album, One Day with Polydor-France, selling 28,000 copies. In 1974 Lucas released another solo album, Pax Spray, which sold 45,000 copies.

Producer
Sideras was also active as a producer. In 1975 he produced the album Alba for Riccardo Cocciante which hit #1 in Italy's charts. He also did a lot of producing for Sigma Fay, starting in 1979 with the album Love's Fool and selling 75,000 copies, and then in 1981 with the album Dead Line, which sold 52,000 copies. In 1983 he produced the single "You're the Drug in My Life" for Sigma Fay and sold 34,000 copies.

Other projects
In 1977 Sideras formed the group Ypsilon with Lakis Vlavianos and Dimitris Katakouzinos. They released the album Metro Music Man, which sold 75,000 copies. 
In 1984 he produced Sigma Fay's single Alien Child, which sold 60,000 copies.
In 1987 he formed the blues-rock band Diesel (not to be confused with the Dutch band of the same name) with Sigma Fay and Yanis Drolapas. The band was together for ten years and appeared regularly as a live act and in jamming sessions, but their sole release was the 1995 album Diesel. While with the band, Sideras also composed music for several documentaries and advertisements in his studio.
In 2000 he formed the blues-rock power trio LST (Lucas Sideras Trio) with Simos Kokavesis and Nikos Giannatos. Lucas Sideras Trio keep on playing live shows till now.
In 2005 he formed the blues-rock band Los-Tres with Simos Kokavesis and Bary Zeally, and they have appeared live numerous times. 
In 2008 Sideras released a solo album Stay With Me which he composed, arranged and produced in his studio. The album was strongly influenced by world music.

References

External Links
 
 

1944 births
Living people
Musicians from Athens
Greek drummers